Lower Kyle Canyon is an unincorporated community in Clark County, Nevada.

References

Unincorporated communities in Clark County, Nevada
Unincorporated communities in Nevada